Antoine Ó Flatharta is an Irish playwright and screenwriter who writes in English and Irish.

Playwriting credits 
Ag Ealaín In Éirinn
An Fear Bréige
An Solas Dearg
Aois na hÓige
Between Venus and Mars
Blood Guilty
City Mission
Dream Walker
Gaeilgeoirí
Imeachtaí na Saoirse
Silverlands
The Native Ground

Movie/film credits
Stella Days
An Bonnán Buí

Television
An Crisis and Crisis Eile
On Home Ground
Grace Harte

References

21st-century Irish people
Irish-language writers
Living people
Irish dramatists and playwrights
Irish male dramatists and playwrights
Irish screenwriters
Irish male screenwriters
Year of birth missing (living people)